The SGB Championship Knockout Cup is a speedway second tier Knockout Cup competition in the United Kingdom. It was renamed in 2017 after previously being called the Premier League Knockout Cup.

Winners

See also
Knockout Cup (speedway) for full list of winners and competitions

References

Speedway competitions in the United Kingdom
Recurring sporting events established in 2017
2017 establishments in the United Kingdom